Mike Bauer successfully defended his title, defeating Miloslav Mečíř 3–6, 6–4, 6–1 in the final.

Seeds

  Chris Lewis (quarterfinals)
  Pat Cash (quarterfinals)
  Paul McNamee (semifinals)
  John Fitzgerald (second round)
  Mike Bauer (champion)
  Chip Hooper (quarterfinals)
  Wally Masur (first round)
  Brad Drewett (semifinals)

Draw

Finals

Top half

Bottom half

External links
 1983 South Australian Open draw

Singles